Wishing for This is a Christmas EP by the alternative rock and indie pop artist and Sixpence None the Richer member Leigh Nash. It was released for download on November 14, 2006. Wishing for This was produced by Mark Nash and Nate Blackstone and is made up of seven tracks: one traditional Christmas song, "O Holy Night", one original Christmas tune (the title track), and five cover tunes.

Track listing
 "Baby, It's Cold Outside" (featuring Gabe Dixon) (Frank Loesser) - 3:16
 "Maybe This Christmas" (Ron Sexsmith) - 2:23
 "Last Christmas" (George Michael) - 3:35
 "O Holy Night"  - 4:02
 "Hard Candy Christmas" (Carol Hall) - 3:23
 "Eternal Gifts" (Kate York) - 3:57
 "Wishing for This" (Leigh Nash) - 3:39

References

2006 EPs
2006 Christmas albums
Leigh Nash albums
Nettwerk Records EPs
Covers EPs
Christmas EPs
Christmas albums by American artists
Alternative rock Christmas albums